The University of Antelope Valley (UAV) is a private, for-profit university in Lancaster, California. It offers masters, bachelors, and associate degrees as well as certificate programs and continuing education courses.

History
The school was founded as Antelope Valley Medical College in 1997 by retired Los Angeles City firefighter / paramedic Marco Johnson and his wife Sandra as a school teaching community CPR, first aid, EMT and other medical training. In 2009 the school was accredited by the United States Department of Education and the Accrediting Council for Independent Colleges and Schools and began granting associate's, bachelor's, and master's degrees and became the University of Antelope Valley.  In 2016 the University of Antelope Valley received its regional accreditation with WASC Western Association of Schools and Colleges.

Academics
UAV offers five associate degrees, eight bachelor's degree programs, and three master's degree programs. A variety of certificate programs are also available. UAV is accredited by the Western Association of Schools and Colleges (WSCUC) and Commission on Accreditation of Allied Health Education Programs (CAAHEP). It is also approved by California's Bureau for Private Postsecondary Education (BPPE). UAV's Paramedic Program is only 1 of 4 programs approved in Los Angeles County.

Athletics
The Antelope Valley athletic teams are called the Pioneers. The university is a member of the National Association of Intercollegiate Athletics (NAIA), primarily competing in the California Pacific Conference (Cal Pac) since the 2015–16 academic year. The Pioneers previously competed as an NAIA Independent within the Association of Independent Institutions (AII) from 2004–05 (when the school began intercollegiate athletics and joined the NAIA) to 2014–15.

Antelope Valley competes in 11 intercollegiate varsity sports: Men's sports include baseball, basketball, cross country, distance track and soccer; while women's sports include basketball, cross country, distance track, soccer, softball and volleyball.

References

External links
 Official website
 Official athletics website

1997 establishments in California
Private universities and colleges in California
Education in Lancaster, California
Educational institutions established in 1997
California Pacific Conference schools